Khaldoun Al-Khuzami (born April 29, 1990) is a Jordanian football player who currently plays as a striker for Ma'an.

References

External links 
 
 jo.gitsport.net
 
 eurosport.com

Jordanian footballers
Jordan international footballers
Jordan youth international footballers
Association football forwards
Footballers at the 2010 Asian Games
Al-Hussein SC (Irbid) players
Mansheyat Bani Hasan players
Al-Sareeh SC players
Al-Faisaly SC players
Al-Arabi (Jordan) players
Al-Salt SC players
Sahab SC players
Al-Jalil players
Ma'an SC players
Jordanian Pro League players
1990 births
Living people
Asian Games competitors for Jordan